In scientific imaging, the two-dimensional spectral signal-to-noise ratio (SSNR) is a signal-to-noise ratio measure which measures the normalised cross-correlation coefficient between several two-dimensional images over corresponding rings in Fourier space as a function of spatial frequency . It is a multi-particle extension of the Fourier ring correlation (FRC), which is related to the Fourier shell correlation. The SSNR is a popular method for finding the resolution of a class average in cryo-electron microscopy.

Calculation 

where  is the complex structure factor for image k for a pixel  at radius . It is possible convert the SSNR into an equivalent FRC using the following formula:

See also 
 Resolution (electron density)
 Fourier shell correlation

Notes

References 

Applied mathematics
Engineering ratios
Measurement
Microscopes